Mariestad BoIS HC is an ice hockey club from Mariestad, Sweden. They are currently playing in the third highest league in Sweden, Division 1.

References

External links
Official homepage

Ice hockey teams in Sweden
Ice hockey teams in Västra Götaland County